James Smythe may refer to:

 James Moore Smythe (1702–1734), English playwright and fop
 James Anderson Smythe, aka James Anderson (1849–1918), Texas–Indian wars soldier
 James Smythe (novelist) (born 1980), British writer

See also
 James Smyth (disambiguation)